Mille chilometri al minuto! (or 1000 km al minuto!) is a 1939 Italian "white-telephones" comedy film directed by Mario Mattoli and starring Nino Besozzi.

Cast
 Nino Besozzi as Guido Renzi
 Antonio Gandusio as L'avvocato
 Mario Ersanilli as Lo scienziato
 Vivi Gioi as Figlia del scienziato
 Romolo Costa as Un altro scienziato
 Franca Volpini as Una cameriera (as Flora Volpini)
 Amelia Chellini as La moglie dell' avvocato

External links

1939 films
Italian comedy films
1930s Italian-language films
1939 comedy films
Italian black-and-white films
Films directed by Mario Mattoli
1930s Italian films